is a railway station on the Keiyō Line in Kōtō, Tokyo, Japan, operated by the East Japan Railway Company (JR East).

Lines
Only all-stations train stops at this station.

Station layout
The station is located underground, with the station concourse on the 1st basement level and the platforms on the 2nd basement level. The station has one island platform serving two tracks.

Platforms

History
The station opened on 10 March 1990.

Station numbering was introduced to the JR East platforms in 2016 with Etchūjima being assigned station number JE03.

Passenger statistics
In fiscal 2010, the station was used by an average of 4,011 passengers daily (boarding passengers only).

Surrounding area

Other stations
 Tsukishima Station (Tokyo Metro Yūrakuchō Line (Y-21) and Toei Ōedo Line (E-16))
 Monzen-Nakachō Station (Tokyo Metro Tōzai Line (T-12) and Toei Ōedo Line (E-15))

Business
 Tokyo Sports newspaper headquarters
 Sports Nippon newspaper headquarters
 Tonichi Printing headquarters

Education
 Tokyo University of Marine Science and Technology Etchujima campus
 Shibaura Institute of Technology Toyosu campus
 Tokyo Dai-san Shōgyō High School
 Kōtō Ward Fukagawa Dai-san Junior High School
 Kōtō Ward Etchujima Elementary School

See also

 List of railway stations in Japan

References

External links

 Etchūjima Station information 

Railway stations in Tokyo
Railway stations in Japan opened in 1990
Stations of East Japan Railway Company